Coleophora otidipennella is a moth of the family Coleophoridae found in Asia and Europe.

Description
The wingspan is 10–12 mm. Coleophora species have narrow blunt to pointed forewings and a weakly defined tornus. The hindwings are narrow-elongate and very long-fringed. The upper surfaces have neither a discal spot nor transverse lines. Each abdomen segment of the abdomen has paired patches of tiny spines which show through the scales. The resting position is horizontal with the front end raised and the cilia give the hind tip a frayed and upturned look if the wings are rolled around the body. C. otidipennella characteristics include greyish appearance streaked with whitish-cream.

Adults are on wing from May to June.

The larvae feed on the seeds of rushes (Luzula species), including field wood-rush (Luzula campestris) and common woodrush (Luzula multiflora). The larvae form a whitish or yellowish case.

Distribution
It is found in most of Europe, the Near East, and the eastern Palearctic realm.

External links
 Swedish Moths
 UKmoths

otidipennella
Moths described in 1817
Moths of Asia
Moths of Europe
Taxa named by Jacob Hübner